List of Guggenheim Fellowships awarded in 1993

See also
Guggenheim Fellowship

References

1993
1993 awards